Jeremy Nichols (born 4 November 1965) is a former Australian rules footballer who played with Melbourne in the Victorian Football League (VFL).

Notes

External links 
		
DemonWiki page

1965 births
Australian rules footballers from Victoria (Australia)
Old Melburnians Football Club players
Melbourne Football Club players
Living people